Gloydius tsushimaensis, or the Tsushima Island pitviper, is a species of venomous snake in the family Viperidae. The species is endemic to Tsushima Island in Japan.

Diet
G. tsushimaensis is known to feed on frogs and shrews. Scavenging behavior has also been observed in the species.

Reproduction
While little is known about the mating seasons of Gloydius species in Japan, present observation suggests that the mating season of G. tsushimaensis is similar to that of G. blomhoffii, which is considered to be August and September.

References

tsushimaensis
Endemic reptiles of Japan
Reptiles described in 1994